A star chart is a map of the night sky.

Star chart or starchart may also refer to:

 Star Chart (TV series), a 1980 Canadian music show
 Star Chart, a television program broadcast by MTV Ukraine
 Star chart, another name for a radar chart, a graphical method of displaying multivariate data
 A star chart is another name for a chore chart
 "Star Chart", a 2014 episode of the Japanese TV series Garo: Makai no Hana
 "Star Chart", a theme song for the anime of The Devil Is a Part-Timer!
 StarChart, a component of the software StarOffice
 StarChart, healthcare software developed by Informatics Corporation of America
 "Star Charts", a 1998 exhibit by American painter Margaret Rinkovsky
 Star Charts, a supplement to the role-playing game FTL:2448
 Star Charts, a 2014 album by the musician Pogo

See also
 Star map (disambiguation)
 Star catalogue